A magic store (also magic shop or magician's supply shop) is an establishment which sells materials for performing magic tricks. Magic shops often also sell practical jokes and novelty items, and frequently serve as informal gathering places for amateur magicians, with some hosting organized magic clubs.

References

Magic (illusion)